Tyson T. Running Wolf is an American politician serving as a member of the Montana House of Representatives from the 16th district. Elected in November 2018, he assumed office on January 7, 2019.

Early life and education

Earlier in his life, Running Wolf worked as an outdoor guide. He earned a Bachelor of Science degree in forest research management from the University of Montana in 2001.

Career

Running Wolf was first elected to represent District 16 in the Montana House of Representatives in 2018. He was re-elected in 2020.

Running Wolf sits on the following committees:
 Fish, Wildlife, and Parks
 State Administration
 Education

Electoral record

Personal life 
Running Wolf is a member of the Blackfeet Nation.

References

Living people
Native American state legislators in Montana
Democratic Party members of the Montana House of Representatives
University of Montana alumni
Blackfeet Nation people
People from Browning, Montana
Year of birth missing (living people)
21st-century American politicians